Julian II may refer to:

 Julian (emperor), Roman emperor 361–363
 Julian II the Roman, Syriac Orthodox patriarch of Antioch 688–708